Gary Brent Smith (born November 21, 1973, in Dallas, Texas) is a former professional American football player who played guard/Offensive tackle for eight seasons for the Miami Dolphins and New York Jets. His son, Cole Smith, currently plays football at Mississippi State University.

External links
Bio from the New York Jets 2004 Media Guide

1973 births
Living people
Players of American football from Dallas
American football offensive guards
American football offensive tackles
Mississippi State Bulldogs football players
Miami Dolphins players
New York Jets players